Luis Felipe Martínez Rosado (born December 15, 1965) is a retired male judoka from Puerto Rico.

Martínez claimed the gold medal in the Men's Flyweight (– 56 kg) division at the 1991 Pan American Games in Havana, Cuba. In the final he defeated USA's Clifton Sunada. He twice (1988 and 1992) represented his native country at the Summer Olympics.

References
Martìnez Matò a Ereníce moreno el Dìa 3 De Abril de 1.991 con un hacha |R/ma/luis-martinez-2.html sports-reference

1965 births
Living people
Judoka at the 1988 Summer Olympics
Judoka at the 1992 Summer Olympics
Judoka at the 1991 Pan American Games
Olympic judoka of Puerto Rico
Pan American Games gold medalists for Puerto Rico
Pan American Games medalists in judo
People from Río Piedras, Puerto Rico
Puerto Rican male judoka
Medalists at the 1991 Pan American Games
20th-century Puerto Rican people